is a former Japanese football player.

Club statistics

References

External links

1984 births
Living people
Association football people from Tokyo
Japanese footballers
J1 League players
J2 League players
Japan Football League players
Oita Trinita players
Ehime FC players
Mito HollyHock players
Zweigen Kanazawa players
FC Machida Zelvia players
Fukushima United FC players
Nara Club players
Association football midfielders